Before the Storm is the fourth studio album by British hard rock/heavy metal band Samson, released in 1982. It is the band's first album with vocalist Nicky Moore, who was recruited to replace Bruce Dickinson after Dickinson joined Iron Maiden. The drummer Mel Gaynor was also replaced by Pete Jupp, when Gaynor left to join Simple Minds. The album was included in the three-disc The Polydor Years, issued by Caroline International in 2017.  The set also includes their followup album Don't Get Mad, Get Even and a third CD with various B-sides, live and studio rarities.

Reception
The album has received decent reviews from critics and fans. A review from AllMusic gave it a decent rating, mentioning how with the departure of Dickinson the band had traded some of their New Wave of British Heavy Metal edge for a less explosive but more natural-sounding hard rock grit. Rivadavia described the album as a "promising start" to the new line-up, with the music moving more toward hard rock and away from heavy metal.

Track listing

2002 CD Reissue bonus tracks 

 Originally release 1982. Digitally transferred by Paul Samson at YDS Norwich, England, 2001. Remastered by Mr. Mestad at Molten Metal Mastering Lab, 2002.

Notes
 The track "I'll Be 'Round" was originally written with Dickinson and appears as "Gravy Train" on the Live at Reading '81 album. Nicky Moore would re-write the lyrics for the re-worked Before the Storm studio version.
 2-track recordings of "Red Skies" and "Turn Out the Lights" from a June 1981 rehearsal, with Dickinson on vocals, are included as bonus tracks on the 2001 Castle Music re-issue and the 2017 Dissonance Productions edition of Live at Reading 81.
 The original version of "Losing My Grip", recorded with Dickinson during the Shock Tactics sessions in early 1981 but left unreleased for two decades, can be found on the 2001 Castle Music re-issue and the 2017 Dissonance Productions edition of Shock Tactics.

Personnel
Samson
 Nicky Moore – lead vocals
 Paul Samson – guitar
 Chris Aylmer – bass guitar
 Pete Jupp – drums

Additional musicians
 Ian Gibbons – keyboards
 Jo Julian – synthesizers on "Dangerzone"

Production
 Jo Julian – producer, engineer
 Ian Cooper – mastering at The Townhouse, London
 Alwyn Clayden – art direction
 Barry Thorpe – painting
 Shoot That Tiger! – design
 Terry McLellan – management

References

External links
 Official Paul Samson website
 Samson - Before the Storm on Discogs

1982 albums
Samson (band) albums
Polydor Records albums